The 16577 / 78 Yesvantpur Junction–Harihar Intercity Express is an Intercity Express train belonging to Indian Railways South Western Railway zone that runs between  and Harihar in India.

It operates as train number 16577 from Yesvantpur Junction to Harihar and as train number 16578 in the reverse direction, serving the states of Karnataka.

Coaches
The 16577 / 78 Yesvantpur Junction–Harihar Intercity Express has one AC chair car, six Chair cars, six general unreserved & two SLR (seating with luggage rake) coaches. It does not carry a pantry car.

As is customary with most train services in India, coach composition may be amended at the discretion of Indian Railways depending on demand.

Service

Routing
The 16577 / 78 Yesvantpur Junction–Harihar Intercity Express runs from Yesvantpur Junction via , Kadur Junction railway station to Harihar.

Traction
As the route is going to electrification, a Krishnarajapuram-based WDM-3A diesel locomotive pulls the train to its destination.

References

External links
16577 Intercity Express at India Rail Info
16578 Intercity Express at India Rail Info

Intercity Express (Indian Railways) trains
Rail transport in Karnataka
Transport in Bangalore